Erich Hess (born 20 June 1947) is a German gymnast. He competed in eight events at the 1968 Summer Olympics.

References

1947 births
Living people
German male artistic gymnasts
Olympic gymnasts of West Germany
Gymnasts at the 1968 Summer Olympics
Sportspeople from Mannheim